Ann D. Montgomery (born May 9, 1949) is a senior United States district judge of the United States District Court for the District of Minnesota.

Education and career

Born in Litchfield, Minnesota, Montgomery received a Bachelor of Science degree from the University of Kansas in 1971 and a Juris Doctor from the University of Minnesota Law School in 1974. She was a law clerk to Gerard D. Reilly and Hubert Pair, both of the District of Columbia Court of Appeals from 1974 to 1975. She was an Assistant United States Attorney of the District of Minnesota from 1976 to 1983. She was a judge on the Hennepin County Municipal Court, Minnesota from 1983 to 1985, and of the county's District Court in Minneapolis from 1985 to 1994.

Federal judicial service

United States magistrate judge service
Montgomery became a United States magistrate judge of the United States District Court for the District of Minnesota in 1994.

United States district court service
On November 27, 1995, Montgomery was nominated by President Bill Clinton to a seat on the United States District Court for the District of Minnesota vacated by Diana E. Murphy. Montgomery was confirmed by the United States Senate on August 2, 1996, and received her commission on August 6, 1996. She assumed senior status on May 31, 2016.

Sources

1949 births
Living people
Assistant United States Attorneys
Judges of the United States District Court for the District of Minnesota
Minnesota state court judges
People from Litchfield, Minnesota
United States district court judges appointed by Bill Clinton
United States magistrate judges
University of Kansas alumni
University of Minnesota Law School alumni
20th-century American judges
21st-century American judges
20th-century American women judges
21st-century American women judges